Georg Achates Gripenberg (18 May 1890 – 31 May 1975) was a Finnish diplomat. He served as an Envoy of Finland to London in 1933–1941 and in Stockholm from 1943 to 1956 and as Finland's first Ambassador  to the United Nations  from 1956 to 1958.

Biography
He was born in Saint Petersburg, Russia Empire, to a noble family. His father, was a State Councilor and an activist for Finnish independence. His mother, Agnes Maria Fredrika von Haartman, was also from a noble family.

From 1908–1909 he also studied at Oxford University and the London School of Economics in England. He eventually took a degree in law from Uppsala University in Sweden, in 1917. He then acted as a private secretary to his father for a short time before moving to Finland to join the civil war in the White Guard.

Prior to his appointment in January 1918 as Finland's first diplomatic representative to Sweden, 
In 1918, he was hired by Finland's newly established Ministry for Foreign Affairs and was appointed his country's first diplomatic representative to Sweden. He resigned the following year. In 1920 he was recruited back to the ministry's office as Permanent Secretary.

He initially served as a Chargé d'Affaires, from 1921–1923 in Brussels and The Hague, from 1923–1929 in Madrid and Lisbon and from 1929–1933 as Envoy to Buenos Aires, Rio de Janeiro and Santiago de Chile.

In 1933, he was appointed Envoy to London, Finland's most important diplomatic post. His term there lasted until diplomatic relations between the  United Kingdom and Finland were broken during the Continuation War, following the  British war declaration at the end of 1941.

He was in non-active status in Finland until he was named representative to the Holy See in the autumn of 1942. The following spring he was transferred to Stockholm. It was, at that time, the most important foreign mission in Finland, especially because the Soviet Union had decided to conduct peace talks with Finland in Stockholm following the end of World War II.

He generally avoided political influence, but was caught in the middle of competing interests because of his position. He served as Envoy for more than a decade of war and was a favorite of President J. K. Paasikivi, who appreciated his qualifications. For the last two years in Stockholm, 1954–1956, he served as the Ambassador.

After Stockholm, he was Finland's first ambassador to the United Nations, after which he retired. He received many domestic and foreign decorations and wrote several extensive memoirs during his retirement years. He died in Helsinki.

References 

Ambassadors of Finland to Sweden
Permanent Representatives of Finland to the United Nations
1890 births
1975 deaths
20th-century Finnish nobility
People of the Finnish Civil War (White side)
19th-century Finnish nobility